Hel is the eighth studio album by the Faroese Viking/folk metal band Týr which was released by Metal Blade Records on 8 March 2019. On 10 January 2019, the group streamed a single titled "Fire and Flame", which predates the album, and was included in it two months later.

Release
Hel was released in 2019, six years after Týr released their seventh album, Valkyrja. Production for the album was long due to the band's tours with Children of Bodom in North America and participation with 70000 Tons of Metal while on a cruise.

Reception

Andrea Caccese of Folk 'n' Rock called Hel a "dynamic, pristine character, which combines lush, sophisticated structures, with the classic fury and unapologetic energy of metal". She also added that "fans of the band will be delighted with [it]", calling Hel an "excellent album" and an "amazing opportunity for new fans to get to discover a fantastic band with a unique flavor".

Track listing

Personnel
Heri Joensen – guitars, vocals
Terji Skibenæs – guitars
Gunnar H. Thomsen – bass
Tadeusz Rieckmann – drums

Charts

References

2019 albums
Týr (band) albums
Metal Blade Records albums